Charles Louis Busch (born August 23, 1954) is an American actor, screenwriter, playwright and drag queen, known for his appearances on stage in his own camp style plays and in film and television. He wrote and starred in his early plays Off-off-Broadway beginning in 1978, generally in drag roles, and also acted in the works of other playwrights. He also wrote for television and began to act in films and on television in the late 1990s. His best known play is The Tale of the Allergist's Wife (2000), which was a success on Broadway.

Biography

Early life
Busch was born in 1954 and grew up in Hartsdale, New York. He is the Jewish son of Gertrude (née Young) and Benjamin Busch. His father, who wanted to be an opera singer, owned a record store. His mother died when Busch was seven. He has two older sisters: Meg Busch, who used to be a producer of promotional spots for Showtime, and Betsy Busch, a textile designer. Busch's aunt, Lillian Blum, his mother's oldest sister and a former teacher, brought him to live in Manhattan after the death of his mother. Busch was intensely interested in films as a young child, especially those with female leads from the 30s and 40s.

Busch attended The High School of Music and Art in Manhattan. He majored in drama at Northwestern University in Evanston, Illinois and received his B.A. in 1976. While at the university, Busch had difficulty being cast in plays and began to write his own material, which succeeded in drawing interest on campus.

Early theatre years

In his plays, Busch usually played the leading lady in drag. He has said, "Drag is being more, more than you can be. When I first started drag I wasn't this shy young man but a powerful woman. It liberated within me a whole vocabulary of expression. It was less a political statement than an aesthetic one." His camp style shows simultaneously send up and celebrate classic film genres.

Busch has said, however, "I'm not sure what [campy] means, but I guess if my plays have elements of old movies and old fashioned plays, and I'm this bigger-than-life star lady, that's certainly campy. I guess what I rebelled against was the notion that campy means something is so tacky or bad that it's good, and that I just didn't relate to." Busch toured the country in a non-drag one-man show he wrote called Alone With a Cast of Thousands from 1978–84.

By 1984, Busch's performance bookings grew slim. He held various odd jobs, such as temporary office assistant, apartment cleaner, portrait artist "at bar mitzvahs", phone salesperson, shop manager, ice cream server, sports handicapper and artists' model.

He thought perhaps that this last piece would be a skit put on in the Limbo Lounge, a performance space and gallery in the East Village in Manhattan. The skit was a hit and became Vampire Lesbians of Sodom (1984).

Busch and his collaborators soon created a series of shows, mostly at the Limbo Lounge, such as Theodora, She-Bitch of Byzantium (1984) and Times Square Angel (1985, Provincetown Playhouse). The company called itself "Theatre in Limbo" and attracted a loyal gay following. Other early plays include Pardon My Inquisition, or Kiss the Blood Off My Castanets (1986), in which Busch played both Maria Garbanza, a prostitute, and her look-alike, the elegant Marquesa del Drago. and Psycho Beach Party, which ran from July 1987 to May 1988. Other works include The Lady in Question, which ran from July to December 1989 at the Orpheum Theatre, and Red Scare on Sunset, which ran from June to September 1991 at the Lortel Theatre.

Busch rewrote the book for the musical Ankles Aweigh for a 1988 production staged by the Goodspeed Opera House in East Haddam, Connecticut.

His Charles Busch Revue was produced at the Ballroom Theatre in May 1993 in New York. Also in 1993, he performed in a revival of Jean Genet's The Maids at the Off-Broadway Classic Stage Company in the role of Solange.

In 1993, he wrote a novel, Whores of Lost Atlantis, a fictionalized re-telling of the creation of Vampire Lesbians of Sodom. The Green Heart was adapted by Busch from a short story by Jack Ritchie into a musical which was produced by the Manhattan Theater Club at the Variety Arts Theatre in New York City, opening in April 1997.

He took the male lead in his comedy, You Should Be So Lucky which opened at Primary Stages Company, New York City, in November 1994.

Other works of the 1990s include Swingtime Canteen, produced at the Blue Angel, New York City, in August 1995. His one-man show, Flipping My Wig ran at the WPA Theater, New York City, starting in December 1996.

He wrote Queen Amarantha, which played at the WPA Theatre, starting in October 1997. His play Die, Mommie, Die! was first performed in Los Angeles, opening in July 1999 at the Coast Playhouse.

Film and television
Busch's early film appearances include Ms. Ellen, a fortune teller in drag in Trouble on the Corner (1997). Busch has twice appeared in film versions of his own plays: Die, Mommie, Die! (1999) and the comedy horror Psycho Beach Party (2000). He co-wrote, starred in and directed the film A Very Serious Person (2006), which starred Polly Bergen and received an honorable mention at the Tribeca Film Festival. In 2020, Busch co-wrote, co-directed, and starred in the film, The Sixth Reel (2021).

Busch had a recurring role in the HBO series Oz from 1999–2000 (the third and fourth seasons) as Nat Ginzburg, an "effeminate but makeup-free inmate on death row, certainly a departure from his usual glamour girl roles." He wrote television sitcom pilots and movie treatments as a source of extra income while he was a cult performer. He sold three pilots to CBS that were not produced.

Stage work, 2000s
Busch's work debuted on Broadway in October 2000, when The Tale of the Allergist's Wife opened, following an Off-Broadway run in February through April 2000. The play, his first in which he did not star, and the first created for a mainstream audience, was written for actress Linda Lavin, who played opposite Michele Lee and Tony Roberts. Allergist's Wife received a 2001 nomination for Tony Award for Best Play and ran for 777 performances. His other Broadway work was rewriting the book for Boy George's short-lived autobiographical musical Taboo. Since 2000, Busch has performed an annual one-night staged reading of his 1984 Christmas play Times Square Angel. In January 2003, he headlined a revival of his 1999 play Shanghai Moon, costarring BD Wong, at the Drama Dept, Greenwich House Theatre, New York City.

He has taken the eponymous lead in three productions of Auntie Mame: a staged reading in 1998; a benefit for Broadway Cares/Equity Fights AIDS in 2003; and a small-scale summer touring production in 2004.

Our Leading Lady, Busch's play about Laura Keene, was produced by the Manhattan Theater Club at the City Center Stage II Theatre, in 2007, and starred Kate Mulgrew. His play, The Third Story, premiered at the La Jolla Playhouse in September 2008 with Mary Beth Peil as Peg, and was then produced in New York by MCC Theatre at the Lucille Lortel Theatre, starring Busch and Kathleen Turner (Peg), opening in February 2009. Busch wrote and starred in a play, The Divine Sister, a satirical take on Hollywood films about religion, including Doubt and the Sound of Music. It ran at the SoHo Playhouse in New York City, opening in September 2010. In 2013, Busch wrote and starred as Jimmy in the Primary Stages production of The Tribute Artist. In March 2019, Busch starred as Lucille Ball in I Loved Lucy by playwright Lee Tannen at the Bridge Street Theatre in Catskill, New York.

Performance style and influences
Busch's style is based on movie star acting rather than naturalistic femininity. Busch later said that he was described as "too thin, too light, which is the euphemism for gay. I was never cast at Northwestern for basically these reasons, and finally, I thought maybe what's most disturbing about me is what is most unique: my theatrical sense, my androgyny, even identifying with old movie actresses". He specializes in femmes fatales. "I'm an actor playing a role, but it's drag. A lot of drag can be very offensive, but I like to think that in some crazy way the women I play are feminist heroines."

Busch said, "I've always played a duality. I guess I've always felt a duality in myself: elegance and vulgarity. There's humor in that. I've always found that fun on stage, as well. It's not enough for me to be the whore. I have to be the whore with pretensions or the great lady with a vulgar streak. It's the duality that I find interesting." Busch generally writes without a political agenda, and he predominantly portrays characters who are white, middle class, gay, and between 20 and 40 years old. Even though Busch worked in a time when gay individuals were viewed and treated differently than straight individuals, straight audiences still enjoyed his work because of his "ability to entertain without creating a members-only atmosphere" (42). 

Busch was inspired by Charles Ludlam, an avant-garde performer and playwright who founded The Ridiculous Theatrical Company in 1967 and wrote, directed, and acted in the company's exaggerated, absurdist camp productions. Busch presented his one-man show Hollywood Confidential in a theater owned by The Ridiculous Theatrical Company in July 1978 at One Sheridan Square, New York. He also appeared for several performances in the company's production of Bluebeard as Hecate, also in July 1978. Busch said of this experience: "If I had ever entertained a fantasy of working with the Ridiculous Theatrical Company, doing Hecate got it out of my system." Busch has said that he was also inspired by seeing Joan Sutherland and Zoe Caldwell perform when he was a child. Busch recalled: "When I was about 13 years old, around 1968 or '69, I went to see Zoe Caldwell in The Prime of Miss Jean Brodie. I was so dazzled that I don't think I've ever recovered." In 1991, Busch was performing in his play Red Scare on Sunset. He said that he had difficulty connecting with the audience at one of the performances. Caldwell went backstage after the performance to give him some advice: "'You are so beautiful. But you were pushing too hard. You're much better than that.' ...It's the best lesson I've learned from a famous person." During his run in The Tribute Artist, Busch revealed that he also found inspiration in drag performers Charles Pierce and Lynne Carter.

Personal life
Busch's memoir, Leading Lady, is set to be published by BenBella Books on August 29, 2023.

Awards and nominations

Busch received the Charlie Local and National Comedy Award from the Association of Comedy Artists in 1985 for "special contributions to the art of comedy." He also received the Manhattan Academy of Cabaret Award in 1985 and 1993.

In 2003, he won the Best Performance Award at the Sundance Film Festival for his performance in the film Die Mommie Die!.

He has been honored with a star on the Playwright's Walk of Fame outside the Lucille Lortel Theatre in New York City and the Legend Award by the Off-Broadway League of Theatres. He was awarded the Gingold Theatrical Group Golden Shamrock award in 2014.

Work

Theater

Filmography

Bibliography

Discography
 Charles Busch Live At Feinstein's/54 Below (2016)

References

External links
 
 
 
 
 Charles Busch papers, 1967-2015, 1984-2014, held by the Billy Rose Theatre Division, New York Public Library for the Performing Arts

1954 births
Northwestern University School of Communication alumni
Living people
Male actors from New York City
The High School of Music & Art alumni
20th-century American male actors
21st-century American male actors
20th-century American dramatists and playwrights
21st-century American dramatists and playwrights
People from Hartsdale, New York
American LGBT dramatists and playwrights
American drag queens
American LGBT novelists
LGBT people from New York (state)
American gay actors
American gay writers
American male dramatists and playwrights
Novelists from New York (state)
20th-century American male writers
21st-century American male writers
20th-century American LGBT people
21st-century American LGBT people